The 1901 Caversham by-election was a by-election in the New Zealand electorate of Caversham, an urban seat in Dunedin at the south-east of the South Island.

Background
The by-election was held on 19 December 1901, and was precipitated by the death of sitting MP, Arthur Morrison. The seat was won by fellow Liberal Thomas Sidey.

There was a large crowd at the declaration of the results, the crowd was rather rowdy and many rotten eggs were thrown at runner-up William Earnshaw.

Results
The following table gives the election results:

References

Caversham 1901
1901 elections in New Zealand
Politics of Dunedin
1900s in Dunedin